Charles Richard Easmon (born July 3, 1963) is a former American football cornerback in the National Football League for the Dallas Cowboys and Tampa Bay Buccaneers. He played college football at the University of Florida.

Early years
Easmon attended Dunnellon High School, where he played quarterback. He was a part of two teams that won the Class 2A state championship. He received All-state honors as a senior.

He accepted a football scholarship from the University of Florida, with the intention of being converted into a wide receiver or cornerback. He started at cornerback in his last 3 seasons. As a senior, he had 49 tackles and 4 interceptions (led the team).

Professional career
Easmon was signed as an undrafted free agent by the Dallas Cowboys after the 1985 NFL Draft. He was waived on September 2. He was re-signed on September 11. He was released on November 9, to make room to activate safety Vince Albritton.

On November 12, 1985, he was claimed off waivers by the Tampa Bay Buccaneers to replace veteran Carl Howard. He played on special teams and as a nickel back. In 1986, he was limited with a thigh injury. He was activated on December 20.

On September 7, 1987, he was placed on the injured reserve list with a knee injury. He wasn't re-signed after the season.

Personal life
His cousin Ernie Mills played wide receiver in the NFL and in the University of Florida.

References

1963 births
Living people
People from Inverness, Florida
Players of American football from Florida
American football cornerbacks
Florida Gators football players
Dallas Cowboys players
Tampa Bay Buccaneers players